Iryna Zvarych (born 8 May 1983 in Chernihiv) is an international Ukrainian football goalkeeper playing for Zvezda Perm. She has won three Leagues and five national Cups with Rossiyanka, where she was the team's first choice goalkeeper. She can also play as a field player, and while playing for Energiya Voronezh she scored a hat trick over KFF Shkiponjat in the 2005 UEFA Women's Cup.

Zvarych took part in the UEFA Women's Euro 2009 as Nadiya Baranova's reserve. With Ukraine eliminated she was a starting player in the final group stage game against Finland, but she had to be replaced five minutes before half time following a collision with Laura Kalmari.

Honours
Lehenda Chernihiv
 Ukrainian Women's League (2) 2001, 2002,
 Women's Cup (2) 2001, 2002

Rossiyanka 
 Russian Leagues: (4) 2005, 2006, 2010, 2011–12
 Russian Cups: (5) 2005, 2006, 2008, 2009, 2010
 Albena Cups: 2005, 2006

Fortuna Hjørring 
 Danish League (1) 2014

Zvezda Perm
Russian Leagues (2) 2015, 2017
Russian Women's Cup (4) 2015, 2016, 2018, 2019

Individual
 Ukrainian Woman Footballer of the Year: (2) 2012, 2013

References

External links

UEFA profile

1983 births
Living people
Footballers from Chernihiv
Ukrainian women's footballers
Ukraine women's international footballers
WFC Lehenda-ShVSM Chernihiv players
FC Energy Voronezh players
WFC Rossiyanka players
Paris FC (women) players
Fortuna Hjørring players
Ukrainian expatriate women's footballers
Montpellier HSC (women) players
Zvezda 2005 Perm players
Expatriate women's footballers in Russia
Expatriate women's footballers in France
Expatriate women's footballers in Denmark
Women's association football goalkeepers
Ukrainian expatriate sportspeople in Azerbaijan
Ukrainian expatriate sportspeople in Russia
Ukrainian expatriate sportspeople in France
Ukrainian expatriate sportspeople in Denmark
Division 1 Féminine players